Simone Antonio Cilio (born 4 September 1992) is an Italian film composer best known for his film scores.

Life and career 
Simone Cilio was born in Niscemi, Italy. In his early career, he worked on the feature film Badsville; his score was nominated as Best Original Score at the Maverick Movie Awards.

Filmography

2013 
  Next To Me (short film) – directed by Sara Mignogna
  How to kill my boyfriend (short film) – directed by Alfonso Perugini
  Avenge my eyes (short film) – directed by Alex Kaplan
  Cinema Cafe (web series) – directed by Paolo Brancati
  La Grande Festa – Capurso (documentary) – directed by Antony Pepe

2014 
  L'Evento – directed by Lorenzo D'Amelio
  Nella tasca del cappotto (short film) – directed by Marco Di Gerlando
  The War at Home (short film) – August Dannehl
  One Night Only (short film) – directed by Brendan Elmore
  Wrong Way (web series) – directed by Ninni Palma
  La proposta (short film) – directed by Mirko Salciarini
  Bastard! (short film) – directed by John Gallegos
  Punctum (short film) – directed by Michael Gaddini

2015 
  Censurado, Ode to love – directed by Mauro Russo Rouge
  Il ricordo di una lacrima – directed by Mario Santocchio
  The Last One – directed by Lee Thongkham (additional music)
  Tears in the dust – directed by Steve Call (additional music)
  The Miracle Archives (short film) – directed by Victor Olea
  Ladies First (short film) – directed by Matthew Staggles
  Chroma Heist (short film) – directed by Charlene Jeter
  Bad Dreams (short film) – directed by Alessandro Wingfield
 A Girl and Her Gun - directed by Paul Holbrook
  Chloe (short film) – directed by Kat Pan
  Making Magic (short film) – directed by Hajar Naim

2016 
  Art of Deception – directed by Richard Ryan
  Skulls – directed by Nicholas Winter
  Space Dogs – The Movie – directed by Matt Greenhalgh
  Aberrante – directed by Mauro Russo Rouge
  One Step Beyond (documentary) – directed by Frank Tierens
  La Forza della Fragilità (documentary) – directed by Maurizio Rigatti
  The Reaping (TV series) – directed by Roberto D'Antona
  The Border (short film) – directed by Norman Tamkivi
  Voice Of Grace (short film) – directed by Laurel Ripley
  A girl and her Gun (short film) – directed by Paul Holbrook and Samuel Dawe
  Brothers (short film) – directed by Magdalena Zielinska
  Discrete Indiscretion (short film) – directed by Charlene Jeter
  Il Naso Rosso (short film) – directed by Simone D'Angelo
  Maximus Invictus (short film) – directed by Marie-Joseph Vijay, Maxime Cailiau, Alpha Omar Diallo

2017 
 Khoj – directed by Arka Ganguly
 Coincidence Theory – directed by Carly Street
 A Suíte Epifânica de Luiza - directed by Elvis DelBagno
 Love Espionage - Spy Revenge - directed by Charlene Jeter
 Losing Life (short film) - directed by Musab Alamri
 Mayday - directed by Massimiliano Cerchi
 And Now a Word From a Gamer (feature documentary) - directed by Steve Wollett
 The Last Signal (feature documentary) - directed by Kyle Olson
 Skin Creepers - directed by Ezra Tsegaye
 Klippers - directed by Ofu Obekpa
 New Boy (short film) - directed by Norman Tamkivi
 Devil 13 (short film) - directed by Robert Bryce Milburn
  Badsville – directed by April Mullen

2018 
 -M- – directed by Lorenzo D'Amelio
 The Rover – directed by Tom Connors
 Volvo Corporate Film - directed by Line Up Communications
 Lockdown - directed by Massimiliano Cerchi
 Olam Cocoa 2018 (corporate film) - director by The Herd Represented
 Belmond Grand Tour 2018 (corporate films) - directed by The Herd Represented
 Stan The Man - directed by Brandon Amelotte
 I Futurieri (short film) - directed by Simone D'Angelo
 Bleed American (feature film) - directed by Tre Manchester
 Belmond - Castello di Casole (Corporate film) - directed by The Herd Represented
 Belmond - Otto Galeng (Corporate Film) - directed by The Herd Represented
 Their War (short film) - directed by Max Mason
 Lockly (commercial) - directed by John Agcaoili

2019 
 Dagli Occhi Dell'Amore - directed by Adelmo Togliani
 The Hayfield Hauntings (TV Series) - directed by Tre Manchester
 K.R.A.P. (short film) - directed by Brynn Chamblee & Hayley Holmes
 Ipsos Creative Excellence (corporate film) - directed by LineUp Communications

2020 
 Ash and Bone - directed by Harley Wallen
 Resilienza - directed by Antonio Centomani
 The Penthouse - directed by Massimiliano Cerchi
 A Dark Path - directed by Nicholas Winter
 Anti Coronavirus - directed by Mitesh Patel
 Active Shooter - directed by Robert Bryce Milburn
 Project Boost (videogame) - developed by Immersion Plus
 A Werewolf in England - directed by Charlie Steeds
 Strangeville - directed by Stephen Osborne

2021 
 Adrenaline - directed by Massimiliano Cerchi
 The Game - directed by Brynn Chamblee
 The Monument of Tolerance - directed by Tracie Hunter
 Werewolf Castle - directed by Charlie Steeds
 Homestead - directed by Ehrland Hollingworth

2022 
 The Bouncer - directed by Massimiliano Cerchi
 The Haunting of Bloody Tower - directed by Charlie Steeds
 Survivor’s Choice - directed by David Clair-Bennett

Awards

External links
 
 
 Checking in with Simone Cilio by James McQuiston
 Soundtrack review for The Miracle Archives by Mihnea Manduteanu
 Badsville on Deadline.com
Interview on Colonnesonore.net

References 

Living people
Italian film score composers
Italian male composers
Italian male film score composers
1992 births
People from Niscemi